Pimalga is a village in the Méguet Department of Ganzourgou Province in central Burkina Faso. The village has a population of 940.

References

Populated places in the Plateau-Central Region
Ganzourgou Province